Odintsov and Odintsova are masculine and feminine forms of a common Russian surname. Notable people with the surname include:

Mikhail Odintsov (1921—2011), a Russian journalist and writer.
Sergei Odintsov (b. 1959), a Russian astrophysicist.
Yevhen Odyntsov (b. 1986), a Ukrainian football player.

Russian-language surnames